NorthTown Mall is a shopping mall located in Nevada Heights, Spokane, Washington, U.S.. The shopping mall first opened in 1955 as an open-air center and has been expanded several times, with its biggest expansion occurring between 1989 and 1991. The mall is currently anchored by Barnes & Noble, Get Air Trampoline Park, J. C. Penney, Kohl's, Marshalls, and Regal Cinemas.

History 
Planning for the shopping center began in early 1950 when Joe Albertson began discussing the possibility of opening an Albertsons supermarket on the side. Shortly after the store's opening in 1951, Albertson and his agent, E.D. McCarthy began planning a shopping center, and they secured options on more land. McCarthy named the proposed center Northtown and quickly received interest from Woolworth and W. T. Grant about opening large stores at the center. After convincing Travelers Life Insurance to commit to substantial loans, H. Halvorson Inc. began construction of Northtown and it was completed in 1955.

In June 1959, Sears confirmed plans to build a  department store at the shopping center. Sears completed its 13-acre site and opened in June 1961.

Spokane-based The Crescent confirmed plans to open a  department store at the shopping center in December 1961. With 38 tenants ready for business, Northtown opened with a grand opening celebration on March 29, 1962. The Crescent opened its store at the shopping center in mid-July. After completion, Northtown featured 41 tenants and employed more than 1,300 people.

In 1976, W. T. Grant closed following a nationwide liquidation of the chain. The former W. T. Grant store was converted into the Northtown Mini-Mall, which featured several small retail shops.

In 1983, Northtown received a facelift and was converted to an enclosed shopping center. The project also added  of new space east of The Crescent store.

Major expansion in the 1990s
In August 1988, plans were announced to add a second level to the shopping center as part of $40 million expansion project. In February 1989, David Sabey, of the Sabey Corporation, officially revealed his plans for the major expansion project. Sabey's plans for the mall included four new department stores, a new Sears store, an additional parking garage, a food court, and dozens of new smaller shops. The plans also required several buildings to be demolished including the current Sears building and the Albertsons and PayLess Drug complex. At the time, Sabey would not reveal the names of the new department stores but chains including Emporium, JCPenney, and Mervyns were reportedly being considered. Sabey also stated that Frederick & Nelson (formerly The Crescent) would remain in the shopping center.

In preparation for the construction, Albertsons closed its store at the shopping center on August 3, 1989. One month later, Sears began liquidating its old store.

Plans to add The Bon Marché to center stalled in late 1989 after the chain's parent company filed for bankruptcy.  In late 1990, Woolworth closed its store after failing to reach an agreement to relocate during construction at the mall. In August 1990, Mervyn's confirmed plans to open a store at the shopping mall. On November 7, 1990, JCPenney announced plans to close two of its three Spokane stores to open a store at NorthTown Mall. By early 1991, Emporium was added to the shopping center's plans and construction on the store began in April. On August 7, JCPenney was the first of the three new department stores to open. Emporium opened for business on October 17. The mall's formal grand opening was held on October 27.

Later additions
An addition including a Barnes & Noble, Nordstrom Rack and Regal Cinemas multiplex was completed in September 2000.

The Bon Marché was re-branded as Bon-Macy's in August 2003, and became a full-fledged Macy's in January 2005. Mervyns was closed in 2007 and replaced with Kohl's in late 2007. The Emporium, which closed in 2003, was replaced with a Steve & Barry's store in 2007 and was closed in 2009 when the chain was liquidated. Nordstrom Rack, which was relocated to Spokane Valley Mall (a shopping center owned by NorthTown owner General Growth Properties) in 2010, was replaced with a Marshalls store in March 2012.

In October 2013, the mall announced plans for a major renovation, which will include demolishing  of retail space in the mall's north end. The mall will also receive a reconfigured parking lot and new interior paint, lighting and signage. On August 6, 2019, Sears announced plans to close its store at the mall in late October as part of a plan to close 26 stores nationwide. On January 5, 2021, it was announced that Macy's would be closing in April 2021 as part of a plan to close 46 stores nationwide.

The mall was sold to the Kohan Retail Investment Group in February 2022 for $49 million.

References

External links 
 

Buildings and structures in Spokane, Washington
Shopping malls established in 1955
Brookfield Properties
1955 establishments in Washington (state)
Shopping malls in Washington (state)
Kohan Retail Investment Group